Bolinichthys is a genus of lanternfishes.

Etymology
The genus is named in honour of Rolf Ling Bolin (1901–1973), an ichthyologist and lanternfish specialist from the Hopkins Marine Station.

Species
The currently recognized species in this genus are:
 Bolinichthys distofax R. K. Johnson, 1975
 Bolinichthys indicus (B. G. Nafpaktitis & M. K. Nafpaktitis, 1969) (lanternfish)
 Bolinichthys longipes (A. B. Brauer, 1906) (popeye lampfish)
 Bolinichthys nikolayi Becker, 1978 (Nikolay's lanternfish)
 Bolinichthys photothorax (A. E. Parr, 1928) (spurcheek lanternfish)
 Bolinichthys pyrsobolus (Alcock, 1890) (fiery lanternfish)
 Bolinichthys supralateralis (A. E. Parr, 1928) (stubby lanternfish)

References

Myctophidae
Marine fish genera
Taxa named by John Richard Paxton